was a Japanese pop group, initially composed of the four Okinawan Tamamoto brothers Kazuo, Mitsuo, Masao, Akira, and sister Taeko.

The Okinawa-based group performed catchy songs, wore matching outfits and had choreographed dance routines. They even performed cover versions of Motown hits, including those of the Jackson 5. The band was formed in 1967 with only the three brothers Kazuo, Mitsuo and Masao, who performed as All Brothers. Conveniently their father owned a bar in Okinawa at which they performed. After winning a local talent contest it was decided that they could go farther if based in Tokyo, although at the time the eldest brother Kazuo was still only 14. The group, who were partly inspired by the Partridge Family TV show, struggled in the Tokyo area, often playing at venues that catered to US military, as they had done in Okinawa.

In 1970, they signed with King Records as the Baby Brothers, but their three releases did not sell well. In early 1972 Akira and Taeko were added to the group and they became Finger Five. Later that year they debuted on the Philips label, with First Album, and scored a huge hit with the single “Kojin Jugyo (Private Lessons)" in 1973. “Kojin Jugyo” sold almost a million and a half copies, and follow-up singles "Koi no Dial 6700 (Love Call 6700)" and “Gakuen Tengoku” were also major hits.

Their songs were primarily about school life and puppy love, and most of their fans were youngsters. After working hard for years, the group had attained superstar status. They became regulars on the weekly TV show Ginza NOW, and made the movies Hello Finger Five, Chonoryoku Dayo! Zenin Shugo and Finger Five No Dai Boken, all of which were released in 1974. That year they also held a joint concert with Canada’s De Franco Family. The group, however, were not able to hold on to their popstar crown very long. In 1975, Kazuo dropped out of the group, and his cousin Minoru Gushiken replaced him. The group was feeling overwhelmed by the sudden stardom thrust on them, and after a good-bye tour, relocated to the United States for late 1975 and early 1976. Besides catching their breath, the members wanted to approach their craft more seriously and evolve beyond being “idols”. However, in their absence, interest in the group waned, and when they returned to release their more mature music, sales evaporated.

In 1978, Finger 5 disbanded, although some members have attempted comebacks, in 1980 as Fingers, 1985 as Zapp, in 1991 as Finger Five, in 1992 as Finger Five Soul Band, and in 1994 as AM Fingers.

Former members
  (born April 8, 1955) - lead guitar, backing vocals (1972–1975)
  (born February 3, 1957) - drums, backing vocals (1972–1978)
  (born February 2, 1959) - bass, backing vocals (1972–1978)
  (born May 9, 1961) - lead vocals, rhythm guitar (1972–1978)
  (born June 7, 1962) - keyboards, backing vocals (1972–1978)
  (born January 23, 1967) - lead guitar, backing vocals (1975–1978)
  (born April 29, 1960) (1978)

Discography

Singles
Baby Brothers
  (June 20, 1970)
  (October 20, 1970)
  (November 20, 1970)
Finger 5
  (August 25, 1972)
  (August 25, 1973)
  (December 1, 1973)
  (December 5, 1973)
  (March 5, 1974)
  (June 25, 1974)
  (September 10, 1974)
  (November 10, 1974)
  (December 25, 1974)
  (February 5, 1975)
  (March 5, 1975)
  (June 21, 1975)
  (November 21, 1975)
  (February 21, 1976)
  (June 1, 1976)
  (September 21, 1976)
  (December 21, 1976)
  (May 1, 1977)
  (July 21, 1977)
  (November 1, 1977)
  (February 1, 1978)
  (June 21, 1978)

Studio albums
  (December 5, 1973)
  (April 10, 1974)
  (May 25, 1974)
  (October 25, 1974)
  (February 5, 1975)
  (March 21, 1976)
  (December 21, 1977)

Compilation albums
  (December 5, 1991)
  (December 21, 1992)
 NEW BEST (May 26, 1993)
  (November 21, 1996)
  (April 21, 1999)
  (April 21, 1999)
 Complete Collection (July 25, 2001)
  (December 19, 2001)
  (November 26, 2003)
 CD&DVD The Best (July 6, 2005)
  (December 9, 2005)
  (August 30, 2006)
  (November 15, 2006)
  (December 19, 2007)
  (July 25, 2012)

Remix albums
  (August 22, 2001)

Boxed sets
  (February 8, 2003)

External links
  (Universal Music Japan)
  (Masao Tamamoto)

Japanese pop music groups
Japanese idol groups
Sibling musical groups
Musical groups from Okinawa Prefecture
Japanese boy bands